The Mary and John Gray Library is an eight-story University Library for Lamar University and the Lamar Institute of Technology in Beaumont, Texas. The library is part of the Federal Depository Library Program that aims to provide government documents free to the public. The library serves as the university's primary research and study center. Construction began on September 17, 1973 at the ground breaking ceremony. Present at the Ceremony were current Texas Governor Dolph Briscoe and Congressman Jack Brooks who was a Lamar Alumnus. The Ground Breaking took place on the same day as the 50th anniversary of the school. The building was named in honor of Mary and John Gray who served the university their entire lives. The library was officially opened on April 26, 1976. Four floors provide stacks for books and periodicals shelved in Library of Congress classification sequence.

Renovations
On November 22, 2021, the university announced Texas Legislature approval of $44.9 million in capital construction assistance toward expansion and improvements to the library.  The planning phase for the three year project began in 2022.

Services
The 8th floor of the library can serve as a reception center for events. The 7th floor holds an open access computer lab hosting 120 computers and a few classrooms as well. The center has three rooms. The Lamar Room is named in honor of former Texas President Mirabeau B. Lamar. The Spindletop Room is named in memory of the Spindletop oil discovery in Beaumont. The Plummer room is named for previous head librarian Miss Julia Plummer.

As the primary research reference for the university the library provides
Indexes and Databases
Interlibrary Loan
Study Rooms
Reference Services

The Library can accommodate 850 students between seating areas, the Starbucks, and the 17 study rooms in the building.

Photo gallery

External links
https://www.lamar.edu/library/

References 

Library buildings completed in 1976
Lamar University
Education in Beaumont, Texas
Buildings and structures in Beaumont, Texas
Federal depository libraries
Libraries in Jefferson County, Texas